The Hollander Tax was a land tax put in place in 1900 by the Puerto Rico's US-appointed Treasurer, Jacob Hollander shortly after the acquisition of the island by the United States following the Spanish American War. It exempted lands priced below $100 and thus fell squarely on middle- and high-income landowners. Because there were no usury laws applicable in Puerto Rico like there were in the United States, interest rates spiked. It is often attributed as being a cause of the shift of land ownership to US banks. The implementation of this law coincided with an artificial devaluation of the Puerto Rican Peso by US authorities.

References 

Land taxation
Taxation in Puerto Rico